Jean-Baptiste Pellissier, full name Pierre Jean-Baptiste Pellissier de Labatut, (22 February 1788 – 11 December 1856) was a 19th-century French playwright and journalist.

Biography 
The son of a lawyer at the parliament of Bordeaux, an intendant of the marquis de Saint-Alvère at Montpezat-de-Quercy (modern Tarn-et-Garonne), he became chief editor of the Mémorial universel and an editor for the Revue encyclopédique (1819–1825). A secretary in the administration of the Opéra-Comique (1828), his plays, sometimes published under the pseudonym Laqueyrie, were presented on the most important Parisian stages of the 19th century including the Théâtre de la Gaîté, the Théâtre de l'Opéra-Comique, and the Théâtre de l'Odéon.

In the Louvre there is a plaster medallion of Pellissier by Etienne Hippolyte Maindron, dated 1853.

Works 

1822: La Leçon paternelle, comedy in 2 acts and in prose, with Desessarts d'Ambreville and Jean Edme Paccard
1823: La Fausse clef ou Les deux fils, melodrama in 3 acts, with Frédéric Dupetit-Méré
1823: Les Mariages écossais, vaudeville in 1 act
1823: Œuvres choisies de Desportes, Bertaut et Régnier, précédées de notices historiques et critiques sur ces poètes et suivies d'un vocabulaire, Firmin-Didot
1824: Le Cousin Ratine, ou le Repas de noce, folie-vaudeville in 1 act, mingled with couplets, with Hubert
1824: La Forêt de Bondi, ou la Fausse peur, comedy in 1 act and in prose
1824: Le Mulâtre et l'Africaine, melodrama in 3 acts, extravaganza, with Dupetit-Méré
1825: Blaisot, ou la Leçon d'amour, tableau villageois in 1 act, with Joseph Desessarts d'Ambreville
1826: Le Moulin des étangs, melodrama in 4 acts, with Dupetit-Méré
1826: Le Duel, drame lyrique in 3 acts, with Desessarts d'Ambreville
1826: Monsieur et Madame, ou les Morts pour rire, folie-vaudeville in 1 act, with Hubert and Eugène Hyacinthe Laffillard
1827: La Somnambule au Pont-aux-Choux, with Charles Hubert
1827: Louise, drama in 3 acts and in prose
1827: Nelly ou La Fille bannie, melodrama in 3 acts
1827: Sangarido, opéra comique in 1 act, with Eugène de Planard
1828: Guillaume Tell, drame lyrique in 3 acts, music by André Ernest Modeste Grétry
1828: La Peste de Marseille, historical melodrama in 3 acts and extravaganza, with René Charles Guilbert de Pixérécourt
1831: Les Deux Mirabeau, vaudeville anecdotique in 1 act
1831: Médicis et Machiavel, drama in 3 acts
1832: La Dame du Louvre, historical drama in 4 acts and in prose, music by Louis Alexandre Piccinni
1832: Le Soldat et le vigneron, vaudeville in 1 act
1834: Léonard, drama in 4 acts
1836: Œuvres choisies de Régnier, précédées d'une notice historique et critique sur ce poète et suivies d'un vocabulaire, Masson
1852: L'Abeille poétique du XIXe siècle, ou, Choix de poésies

Bibliography 
 Jean Marie Quérard, La France littéraire, tome 7, PEA-REZ, 1835, (p. 35) 
 Jean-Pons-Guillaume Viennet, Raymond Trousson, Mémoires et journal: 1777-1867, 2006, (p. 772)

References 

19th-century French dramatists and playwrights
19th-century French journalists
French male journalists
1788 births
1856 deaths
19th-century French male writers